Mary Nash may also refer to:

 Mary Nash (actress) (1884–1976), American actress
 Mary Nash (author) (1925–2020), American writer
 Mary Nash (historian) (born 1947), Irish-Spanish academic

See also
 St Mary's Church, Nash, Newport, South Wales